The 2011 NCAA Division I softball season, play of college softball in the United States organized by the National Collegiate Athletic Association (NCAA) at the Division I level, began in February 2011.  The season progressed through the regular season, many conference tournaments and championship series, and concluded with the 2011 NCAA Division I softball tournament and 2011 Women's College World Series.  The Women's College World Series, consisting of the eight remaining teams in the NCAA Tournament and held in Oklahoma City at ASA Hall of Fame Stadium, ended on June 7, 2011.

Conference standings

Women's College World Series
The 2010 NCAA Women's College World Series took place from June 2 to June 7, 2011 in Oklahoma City.

Season leaders
Batting
Batting average: .504 – Stephanie Thompson, Brown Bears
RBIs: 101 – Christi Orgeron, Louisiana Ragin' Cajuns
Home runs: 24 – Hoku Nohara, New Mexico State Aggies

Pitching
Wins: 40-10 – Jolene Henderson, California Golden Bears
ERA: 0.95 (37 ER/271.1 IP) – Chelsea Thomas, Missouri Tigers
Strikeouts: 498 – Sara Plourde, UMass Minutewomen

Records
Freshman class consecutive games hit streak:
36 – Stephanie Tofft, Northern Illinois Huskies; March 4-May 1, 2011

Junior class RBIs:
101 – Christi Orgeron, Louisiana Ragin' Cajuns

Awards
USA Softball Collegiate Player of the Year:
Ashley Hansen, Stanford Cardinal

Honda Sports Award Softball:
Kelsey Bruder, Florida Gators

All America Teams
The following players were members of the All-American Teams.

First Team

Second Team

Third Team

References

External links